Great Budworth is a village and civil parish in Cheshire, England,  north of Northwich off the A559 road, east of Comberbach, northwest of Higher Marston and southeast of Budworth Heath. Until 1948, Great Budworth was part of the Arley Hall estate.

At the 2011 census, the population was 339.

Etymology
According to Sir Peter Leycester, the name Great Budworth comes from the Old Saxon words bode ("dwelling") and wurth ("a place by water").

Geography

It was situated in the hundred of Bucklow and deanery of Frodsham. The parish contained nineteen townships: Budworth, Anderton, Appleton-cum-Hull, Aston-juxta-Budworth, Barnton, Barterton, or Bartington, Cogfoall, Comberbach, Dutton, Little-Leigh, Marbury, Marston, Pickmere, Stretton, Nether-Tabley, Over-Witley, Nether Witley, and Wincham.

History
The early history of Great Budworth is documented in the Domesday Book, which mentions a priest at Great Budworth. In 1130, St Mary and All Saints Church was given to the Augustinian canon of Norton Priory by William FitzNigel, Constable of Chester and Baron of Halton.

The lord of the manor during the reign of Henry III was Geoffrey de Dutton. He donated to Norton Priory a third of his land to endow masses for his soul. After the dissolution of the monasteries, King Henry VIII granted the estate to John Grimsditch. It was afterwards divided into several parcels.

There may have been a school in Great Budworth as early as 1563, but certainly one existed by 1578. For centuries, the village was owned by the head of Arley Hall who would collect rent from the villagers. Rowland Egerton-Warburton of Arley Hall paid for restorations and improvements to the church in the 1850s. Egerton-Warburton also undertook a "campaign to render it (the village) picturesque in Victorian eyes". To this end he commissioned architects including William Nesfield and John Douglas to work on buildings in the village. Douglas remodelled the George and Dragon inn in 1875, and restored some of the cottages.

A running pump was the only source of drinking water for the whole community until 1934 when a piped supply was first connected. Until 1948, Great Budworth was part of the Arley Hall estate.

Notable landmarks
The Grade I listed St Mary and All Saints Church is in the village.  Arley Hall, a historic house, is nearby. Also of note in the area are the George and Dragon and Cock o' Budworth public houses, 54–57 High Street, Dene Cottages, Goldmine House and Belmont Hall.

St Mary and All Saints' Church

St Mary and All Saints' Church is recorded in the National Heritage List for England as a designated Grade I listed building. It is an active Anglican parish church in the diocese of Chester, the archdeaconry of Chester and the deanery of Great Budworth. Clifton-Taylor includes it in his list of best English parish churches. Richards describes it as "one of the finest examples of ecclesiastical architecture remaining in Cheshire". The architectural historian Nikolaus Pevsner considered it to be "one of the most satisfactory Perpendicular churches in Cheshire". In the north chapel is a memorial to Sir Peter Leicester, the 17th-century historian, and in the Warburton Chapel is the alabaster effigy of Sir John Warburton who died in 1575. In the north chapel is an organ designed by Samuel Renn, installed in 1839.

Houses

Goldmine House and its attached cottage (Rose Cottage), designated as a Grade II listed building, were built in 1870 for Rowland Egerton-Warburton of Arley Hall and were designed by the Chester architect John Douglas. Built with brown brick with some timber framing, and clay tile roofs the house faces west. It is a double storied building with two gabled bays. The cottage is simple in form with a dormer and blue brick diapering.

Dene Cottages, a Grade II listed pair of cottages, were built in 1867–68, again for Rowland Egerton-Warburton and by Douglas. The lower storeys are constructed in brown brick. The upper storeys are timber-framed with plaster panels. The roof is in clay tiles. The plaster panels are pargetted with floral motifs.

Belmont Hall in this parish was built by J. H. Smith-Barry Esq., who deposited in it his valuable collection of pictures and statues, afterwards removed to Marbury. Smith-Barry sold it to Henry Clarke. Built in 1755 and designed by James Gibbs, it is a Grade I listed building. As of 2020 it is occupied by Cransley School.

George and Dragon pub

The George and Dragon pub, another Grade II listed building, was initially built as a simple three-bay Georgian inn. In 1875, John Douglas was commissioned to restore it by Egerton-Warburton. He added tall rubbed chimneys, mullioned windows and a steep pyramidal turret. The double-storied inn has bays built in brick with a roughcast rendering on the upper storey. It has clay tiled covered hipped roofs. Its other architectural features comprise a projecting two-storey porch with oak post-and-rail fence inscribed with a number of sayings on either side, lateral bay with four-light mullioned window in the lower storey and a three-light mullioned window in the upper storey, a tall rubbed brick chimneystack, and the inn sign located diagonally from the right corner. The inn continues to function as a public house and restaurant. In 2015 the pub was used as a location in the video game Contradiction by developer Baggy Cat.

54–57 High Street
54–57 High Street is a row of four Grade II listed dwellings in the High Street, built in the early 18th century. They were refaced and partly rebuilt for Rowland Egerton-Warburton of Arley Hall by John Douglas in 1870 or 1875. The two outer buildings are houses and the two central buildings are cottages. They are built in brown brick with clay tile roofs, and have two storeys plus attics. Each building has a gable, those on the outer buildings larger than those on the inner, all decorated with brick and plaster.

Flora and fauna
In the Middle Ages, Budworth Mere was used as a fish hatchery. Stocked with bream and pike, its reeds shelter breeding reed warblers and great crested grebes. Other avifauna includes mallards and coots.

Culture
The Soul Cakers Play is a seasonal folk play performed in the village every November which brings together the whole community. It features Saint George, the Black Knight and a Hobby Horse. In Great Budworth, the "soul cake" may be a glass of beer or other sustenance; into it comes the devil, or Beelzebub, now "Belshy Bob". The village is a popular location for films and television including Cluedo, and more recently a NatWest advert and the 2019 BBC drama War of the Worlds.

See also

Listed buildings in Great Budworth

References
Citations

Bibliography

External links

Villages in Cheshire
Civil parishes in Cheshire